Syrokomla - is a Polish coat of arms. It was used by several szlachta families in the times of the Polish–Lithuanian Commonwealth.

History
According to the legend, the coat of arms was granted to certain knight named Syrokomla of Abdank coat of arms after he won a duel with a pagan Old Prussian warrior in 1331 during the reign of Ladislaus the Short. After this victory he was awarded with a right to add a golden cross to his coat of arms, to underline that he is one of the defenders of Christianity.

Blazon
Gules, Abdank (W-shaped symbol) Argent, with a cross Or (sometimes Argent) attached above. In the crest the symbol repeated.

Notable bearers
Notable bearers of this coat of arms include:

 Michał Grocholski
 Franciszek Grocholski
 Władysław Syrokomla (1823-1862), writer

External links 
  Syrokomla Coat of Arms & bearers.

See also
 Polish heraldry
 Heraldry

Polish coats of arms